Lily Was Here is the soundtrack album to the 1989 Dutch drama film of the same name (original title in Dutch: De Kassière, The Cashier), directed by Ben Verbong. The soundtrack was produced and largely written by David A. Stewart, one half of the British pop duo Eurythmics.

The title track from the soundtrack, an instrumental duet between Stewart playing guitar and Candy Dulfer on saxophone, who also features on and co-wrote three of the other tracks, was released as a single and charted in numerous countries including reaching number one in the Netherlands for four weeks, number 6 in the UK Singles Chart and number 11 on the US Billboard Hot 100.

The soundtrack also includes a new version of the Eurythmics' 1984 single "Here Comes the Rain Again", featuring Annie Lennox on vocals.

Critical reception

In a review for AllMusic, Sara Sytsma gave Lily Was Here three out of five stars, describing the soundtrack as "an atmospheric, subdued effort, highlighted by a revamped "Here Comes the Rain Again"[...]".

Track listing

Personnel
Adapted from the album's liner notes.

Musicians
David A. Stewart – guitars
Candy Dulfer – saxophone (tracks 1–4 & 16)
Virginia Astley – vocals (track 7), keyboards (track 1 & 7)
Annie Lennox – vocals (track 8)
Chucho Merchán – bass guitar
Olle Romo – drums
Pat Seymour – keyboards

Production
Produced by David A. Stewart
Strings arranged by Pat Seymour; additional arrangement by Ed Shearmur 
Recording and mixing engineers: Steve McLaughlin, Gary Bradshaw; production assistant: Tony Quinn

Charts

References

External links
Lily Was Here at Discogs

1989 soundtrack albums
RCA Records soundtracks
Albums produced by David A. Stewart